Mill House (1957–1975) was an Irish-bred but English-trained racehorse. He is considered one of the best National Hunt racing competitors in UK horse racing history but whose quality was overshadowed by arch rival Arkle.  Mill House won the 1963 Cheltenham Gold Cup and 1967 Whitbread Gold Cup.

Known as 'The Big Horse' on account of his height of 18 hands, Mill House took part in one of the most famous battles of National Hunt Racing when in March 1964, he defended his Cheltenham crown against the Irish star Arkle. Trained by Fulke Walwyn and ridden by Willie Robinson, Mill House matched Arkle stride for stride over the last two miles before losing by five lengths.

The following year, Mill House took Arkle on again in the Gold Cup but lost. His size meant increasing back problems, and he failed to participate in 1966 when Arkle won his third crown. In 1967, Mill House was back but Arkle was not, having been retired after suffering a serious leg injury a few months before at Kempton. However, Mill House slipped and fell at an open ditch in the back straight and left the race to a virtual unknown, Woodland Venture.

A few weeks later, Mill House won the prestigious Whitbread Gold Cup under top weight at Sandown Park. It was his last major win. Continuing back weakness plagued his campaign in 1968 when he fell again in both the Cheltenham and Whitbread Gold Cups. He died in October 1975.

Mill House still has among the highest ratings ever for a National Hunt horse - see Timeform.

References

 Mill House's pedigree and racing stats

1957 racehorse births
1975 racehorse deaths
Racehorses bred in Ireland
Racehorses trained in the United Kingdom
Cheltenham Gold Cup winners
Cheltenham Festival winners
Thoroughbred family 21-a
National Hunt racehorses